The 1988 CONCACAF Champions' Cup was the 24th. edition of the annual international club football competition held in the CONCACAF region (North America, Central America and the Caribbean), the CONCACAF Champions' Cup. It determined that year's club champion of association football in the CONCACAF region and was played from 11 March till 21 December 1988.

The teams were split in 2 zones, North/Central America and Caribbean, (as North and Central America sections combined to qualify one team for the final), each one qualifying two teams to the final tournament.

Hondurean club Olimpia beat Trinidarian side Defence Force 4–0 on aggregate to become champions, thus achieving their second CONCACAF trophy.

North/Central American Zone

Preliminary round 

Morelia, Cruz Azul and Alajuelense advance to the First Round.

First round

North American Zone

Morelia and Cruz Azul advance to Fourth Round.

Central American Zone

Played in Guatemala City

*Alajuelense and Marathon advance to the Third Round.

Second round

Central American Zone

Played in Tegucigalpa

*Olimpia and Aurora advance to the Third Round.

Third round

Central American Zone

Played in Tegucigalpa

*Alajuelense and Olimpia advance to the Fourth Round.

Fourth round

North/Central American Zone

Morelia disqualified after refusing to play the series.*
Olimpia and Alajuelense advance to the CONCACAF Semi-Finals.

Caribbean Zone

First round
Matches and results unknown: Zenith Robinhood Sion Hill Cardinals

All clubs in BOLD advance to the second round.

Second round
Matches and results unknown: La Gauloise Seba United Sport Guyanais

Further results for the following round are unknown;Robin Hood and Defence Force advance to the CONCACAF Semi-Finals.

Semi-finals 

Olimpia and Defence Force advance to the CONCACAF Final.

Final

First leg

Second leg 

Olimpia won 4–0 on points and also 4–0 on aggregate.

Champion

References

1
CONCACAF Champions' Cup
c
c